Andrew Tosney (born 3 June 1964) is an English former rugby league footballer who played in the 1980s. He played at representative level for Great Britain (Colts), and at club level for Hunslet Boys Club, Hunslet, Hull Kingston Rovers and Wakefield Trinity (Heritage No. 939), as a goal-kicking , i.e. number 6. , he is the Vice president of Global Sales for Mondelēz International.

Playing career
Andy Tosney was born in Leeds, West Riding

Playing career
Andy Tosney made his debut for Wakefield Trinity during September 1984, he played 37-matches, scoring 6-tries and 10-goals for 42-points, he played his last match for Wakefield Trinity during the 1986–87 season, and he retired from professional rugby in the 1990s after a serious ankle injury.

Business career
He joined Terry's of York in 1985 and worked as a salesman. US food company Kraft Foods took over the northern chocolate company in 1993.

Tosney worked at Kraft Foods from 1993 and with subsidiary company Terry's 7 years before that. He was Kraft Foods' Global Customer Director, leading the Wal-Mart International team for a US$850 million business. Through local, regional and Global joint business planning, Kraft Foods were awarded "most improved" International supplier in 2007 (one of only 3 awards given to suppliers in Wal-Mart), in 2008 Kraft were awarded "best in the world supplier" under Tosney's leadership.

In December 2011 in an interview with Retail in Asia, Tosney explained that Kraft had doubled its salesforce across Asia-Pacific to 10,000 people and by 2012 it will have increased a further 50%.

On 1 October 2012, Kraft Foods Inc split into two separate business entities; Kraft Foods Group and Mondelēz International. As of 2011, he is the Global Vice president, Sales, for Mondelēz International.

As of 2011, he resides in Dubai with his wife.

References

1964 births
Living people
English rugby league players
Hull Kingston Rovers players
Hunslet R.L.F.C. players
Rugby league players from Leeds
Rugby league five-eighths
Salespeople
Wakefield Trinity players
Rugby articles needing expert attention